Vandve Church is a chapel of the Church of Norway in Dønna Municipality in Nordland county, Norway. It is located in the island village of Vandve. It is an annex chapel in the Dønna parish which is part of the Nord-Helgeland prosti (deanery) in the Diocese of Sør-Hålogaland. The white, wooden chapel was built in a rectangular style in 1956 using plans drawn up by the architect Arne Reppen. The chapel seats about 50 people. The church was originally named "Vandve Chapel" until 1980 when it was renamed "Vandve Church".

See also
List of churches in Sør-Hålogaland

References

Dønna
Churches in Nordland
Wooden churches in Norway
20th-century Church of Norway church buildings
Churches completed in 1956
1956 establishments in Norway
Rectangular churches in Norway